Danielson is an American rock band.

Danielson may also refer to:

Danielson, Connecticut, a borough in the U.S. state of Connecticut
Danielson (surname)
Danielson (crater), an impact crater in the Oxia Palus quadrangle on Mars
Danielson (footballer) (born 1981), Danielson Ferreira Trindade, Brazilian footballer

See also
Danielsson (disambiguation)
Danielsen (disambiguation)
Danielsan (disambiguation)
Denílson (disambiguation)
Donelson (disambiguation)